The Real Arsenal was located in Havana, Cuba and was at one time the largest shipyard in the world during the 1700s. It produced ships like Santísima Trinidad.

References

Further reading 
 

History of Havana
Shipyards of Cuba